Minuscule 848 (in the Gregory-Aland numbering), Θε47 (von Soden), is a 14th-century Greek minuscule manuscript of the New Testament on parchment. The manuscript has no complex content.

Description 

The codex contains the text of the Gospel of Luke on 442 parchment leaves (size ), with a catena. The text is written in one column per page, 21 lines per page.
The biblical text is surrounded by a catena, the commentary is of Theophylact's authorship.

Text 
The Greek text of the codex is a representative of the Byzantine text-type. Kurt Aland the Greek text of the codex did not place in any Category V.
According to the Claremont Profile Method it represents the textual family Kx in Luke 10 and Luke 20. In Luke 1 it has mixed text. It belongs to the textual pair with 1255.

History 

F. H. A. Scrivener dated the manuscript to the 11th century, C. R. Gregory dated it to the 14th century. Currently the manuscript is dated by the INTF to the 14th century.

The manuscript once belonged to Cardinal Domenico Passionei. It was examined and described (with a facsimile) by Giuseppe Bianchini.

The manuscript was added to the list of New Testament manuscripts by Scrivener (611e) and Gregory (848e). C. R. Gregory saw it in 1886.

Currently the manuscript is housed at the Biblioteca Angelica (Ms. 21), in Rome.

See also 

 List of New Testament minuscules
 Biblical manuscript
 Textual criticism
 Minuscule 847

References

Further reading

External links 
 

Greek New Testament minuscules
14th-century biblical manuscripts